Himalaphaenops nishikawai is a species of beetle in the family Carabidae, the only species in the genus Himalaphaenops.

References

Trechinae